Timegates is a 1997 anthology of short stories edited by Jack Dann and Gardner Dozois.

Contents 
Air Raid by John Varley
The Man Who Walked Home by James Tiptree, Jr.
Another Story by Ursula K. Le Guin
Full Chicken Richness by Avram Davidson
The Price of Oranges by Nancy Kress
The Secret Place by Richard McKenna
Anniversary Project by Joe Haldeman
Time's Arrow by Jack McDevitt
Hole-in-the-Wall by Bridget McKenna
Anachron by Damon Knight
Trapalanda by Charles Sheffield
The Hole on the Corner by R. A. Lafferty

External links 

1997 anthologies
Jack Dann and Gardner Dozois Ace anthologies
Ace Books books
Short fiction about time travel